Beloderoides nigroapicalis is a species of beetle in the family Cerambycidae, and the only species in the genus Beloderoides. It was described by Breuning in 1940.

References

Desmiphorini
Beetles described in 1940
Monotypic Cerambycidae genera